The women's discus throw event at the 1988 World Junior Championships in Athletics was held in Sudbury, Ontario, Canada, at Laurentian University Stadium on 30 and 31 July.

Medalists

Results

Final
31 July

Qualifications
30 Jul

Group A

Participation
According to an unofficial count, 16 athletes from 11 countries participated in the event.

References

Discus throw
Discus throw at the World Athletics U20 Championships